"La Curiosidad" is a song by Colombian singer Maluma. The song is taken from the mixtape PB.DB The Mixtape. It was released as the mixtape's second single on 27 January 2014, by Sony Music Colombia. The song peaked at number 48 on the Billboard Hot Latin Songs chart and at number 37 on the Billboard Latin Pop Songs chart.

Music video
The music video for "La Curiosidad" premiered on 5 May 2014 on Maluma's Vevo account on YouTube. It was filmed in Miami, Florida and was directed by Luieville & Company. The music video has so far surpassed over 230 million views on YouTube.

Charts

References

2014 singles
2014 songs
Maluma songs
Sony Music Latin singles
Spanish-language songs
Latin pop songs
Sony Music Colombia singles
Songs written by Maluma (singer)